Seven Sisters is a National Rail, London Overground and London Underground Victoria line station in the Seven Sisters area of the London Borough of Haringey, north London. The station has two entrances/exits, one on Tottenham High Road and the other on Seven Sisters Road.

The station is in Travelcard Zone 3. Seven Sisters lies between Finsbury Park and Tottenham Hale on the Victoria line and between Stamford Hill and Bruce Grove on the Lea Valley Cheshunt/Enfield Town Line from Liverpool Street, operated by London Overground. Abellio Greater Anglia also serve at peak times. It is a short distance from South Tottenham station on London Overground's Gospel Oak to Barking line.

History
The station was constructed by the Great Eastern Railway (GER) on its Stoke Newington & Edmonton Railway line and opened on 22 July 1872. On 1 January 1878, the GER opened a branch line, the Palace Gates Line, from Seven Sisters station to Noel Park and later that year to Palace Gates (Wood Green) station.

The Palace Gates Line was closed by British Rail in 1963 for passengers and 1964 for freight, with the branch line track and platforms at Seven Sisters later removed.

On 24 July 1967 planning permission was granted to convert the station for London Underground use. The first section of the Victoria line opened on 1 September 1968 serving Seven Sisters, although a shared entrance and interchange facilities with the surface station were not opened until December 1968. The original GER entrance to the station was situated in West Green Road at the north end of the surface station, but the new combined entrance was opened in Seven Sisters Road at the south end on the site of a former wood merchants yard, connecting to the west end of the Victoria line platforms. The original (1872) entrance was closed at that time.
The National Rail platforms are not at street level. Platform 1 (towards London Liverpool Street) is accessed by twin staircases. Platform 2 (towards Enfield Town & Cheshunt) has a staircase and an "up" escalator.

A second entrance at the east end includes the main Victoria line ticket hall, and is accessed via subways on each side of High Road just north of the junction with Seven Sisters Road.  There are three Victoria line platforms at Seven Sisters: with one platform (platform 4) reserved for services which terminate at the station to return to the depot or reverse back into central London, although a connection is available for trains to continue to Walthamstow Central.

The distance between Seven Sisters and Finsbury Park stations on the Victoria line is 3.15 km making it the longest distance between adjacent stations in deep level tunnels on the London Underground network. During the planning phase of the Victoria line, thought was given to converting Manor House into a Victoria line station and diverting the Piccadilly line in new tunnels directly from Finsbury Park to Turnpike Lane via Harringay Green Lanes, but the idea was abandoned because of the inconvenience this would cause, as well as the cost.

On 31 May 2015 the station and all services that call here, transferred from Abellio Greater Anglia to London Overground. Some Greater Anglia services are scheduled to call at this station at peak times.

During summer 2015, there was no Victoria Line service between Seven Sisters and Walthamstow Central to facilitate works outside of Walthamstow station which would boost capacity along the line.

Future
In May 2013 it was announced that the station would be on the latest proposed route for Crossrail 2, with a double-ended underground station built linking South Tottenham and Seven Sisters stations.

Connections
London Buses routes 41, 76, 149, 243, 259, 279, 318, 349, 476 and night routes N41, N73 and N279 serve the station.

Seven Sisters is the nearest station on the London Underground network to Tottenham Hotspur Stadium and footfall is heavy on home match days.

References

External links

 
 Disused stations - closed Palace Gate branch platforms
 London Transport Museum Photographic Archive
 
 
See How they Run - Plan showing layout of Seven Sisters station below ground (archived from  the original on 23 September 2006)

Victoria line stations
London Underground Night Tube stations
Tube stations in the London Borough of Haringey
Railway stations in the London Borough of Haringey
Former Great Eastern Railway stations
Railway stations in Great Britain opened in 1872
Greater Anglia franchise railway stations
Railway stations served by London Overground